Colobot (Colonize with Bots) is an educational, post apocalyptic real-time strategy video game featuring 3D graphics, created by Swiss developer Epsitec SA. The objective of the game is to find a planet for colonization by the human race by establishing a basic infrastructure on the surface and eliminating any alien life forms endangering the expedition. The game takes place on the  Earth, Moon, and seven fictional planets. The main feature of the game, which makes it educational, is the possibility for players to program their robots using a programming language similar to C++ or Java.

Plot overview 
Life on earth is threatened by a devastating cataclysm, forcing mankind to move out and search for a new home. A first expedition composed solely of robots was sent to find another habitable planet. However, for unknown reasons, the mission was a disaster and never returned.

With only a few robots for companions, the player must travel to new planets. Houston, Earth Mission Control as well as a spy satellite will transmit valuable information to the player. The player needs to build the infrastructure necessary to gather raw materials, energy supplies, and produce the weapons necessary to defend themselves. By programming robots, the player can delegate tasks to them, allowing the player to continue their mission while their robots upkeep the base, fight off enemies, harvest materials, and perform any other tasks assigned to them.

Missions

In the game, the player explores Earth, Moon and seven fictional planets.

Language overview 

Example code for a bot to find a piece of titanium ore and deliver it to a purification facility:

extern void object::FetchTitanium()
{
	object item; // declare variable
		
	item = radar(TitaniumOre); // find a piece of titanium ore
	goto(item.position); // go to the ore
	grab(); // pick up whatever is in front of the robot (presumably the ore)
	
	item = radar(Converter); // find the ore converter
	goto(item.position); // relocate to the converter
	drop(); // drop the piece of ore
	move(-2.5); // back up 2.5 meters to allow the converter to start processing the ore
}

Legacy
Epsitec released the games' source code in March 2012 under GNU GPL-3.0-or-later after being contacted by the Polish game enthusiast community PPC.

ICC & TerranovaTeam (formerly PPC) was given the source code by Epsitec under the GPL-3.0-or-later license. TerranovaTeam is in the process of updating the game, titled .

Similar games 
CeeBot, also made by Epsitec, is a very similar series of games spanning four titles:
CeeBot-A – an expansion of Colobot's Exercises & Challenges.
CeeBot-Teen – geared to and simplified for a younger audience. Has basic programming exercises.
CeeBot3 – a program-to-paint programming course that allows students to make drawings and animations.
CeeBot4 – a major programming course for college students and audiences in the programming field.

Reception 
The game has been recommended by the Polish Ministry of National Education as a teaching aid for learning the basics of algorithms and object-oriented programming.

External links
Epsitec Colobot webpage
Colobot: Gold Edition website - International Colobot Community

References

2001 video games
Open-source video games
Strategy video games
Programming games
Video games about robots
Windows-only games
Commercial video games with freely available source code
Video games developed in Switzerland